Pakistani art has a long tradition and history. It consists of a variety of art forms, including painting, sculpture, calligraphy, pottery, and textile arts such as woven silk. Geographically, it is a part of Indian subcontinent art, including what is now Pakistan.

History 
After independence in 1947, there were only two major art schools in Pakistan - the Mayo School of Art and the Department of Fine Arts at the Punjab University. Early pioneers of Pakistani art include Abdur Rahman Chughtai who painted with Mughal and Islamic styles, and Ahmed Parvez who was among the early modernists of Pakistan.

In the 1960s and 1970s, calligraphic styles emerged in Pakistan, with notable artists being Iqbal Geoffrey and Sadequain. The Karachi School of Art, the first art institution in Karachi, was founded in 1964 by Rabia Zuberi.

In the 21st century, graffiti started becoming popular in Pakistan, with the emergence of artists such as Sanki King, and Asim Butt. The latter also spearheaded Stuckism in Pakistan.

Art museums and galleries 

Major art galleries in Pakistan include the National Art Gallery in Islamabad. The Lahore Museum is known for its extensive collection of Buddhist art from the ancient Indo-Greek and Gandhara kingdoms, as well as from the Mughal, Sikh, and British empires.

Famous Artists 
 Abdur Rahman Chughtai
 Awais Shaukat
 Sadequain
 Ahmed Parvez
 Ismail Gulgee
 Zahoor ul Akhlaq
 Jamil Naqsh
 Saira Wasim
 Shahzia Sikander

External links

See also 

 Truck art in South Asia
 List of Pakistani artists
 Pakistani comics
 Indian art
 Asian art

References 

Art
Art by country
Pakistani art